Wicker railway station (later Wicker Goods railway station) was the first railway station to be built in Sheffield, England. It was to the north of the city centre, at the northern end of the Wicker, in the fork formed by Spital Hill and Savile Street. It was opened on 31 October 1838 as the southern terminus of the Sheffield and Rotherham Railway, which ran north to Rotherham Westgate railway station.

In 1840, the line was connected to the North Midland Railway at Rotherham Masborough railway station. Carriages from Sheffield would be attached to North Midland trains for onward travel. A southbound curve was added in 1869.

On 1 January 1847, a half-mile connecting line from the Wicker to the Bridgehouses station of the Manchester, Sheffield and Lincolnshire Railway had been constructed in order to increase goods traffic and enable wagon transfers. This short steeply graded line, enclosed within a tunnel for almost its entire length was known locally as the Fiery Jack.

Wicker was replaced as a passenger station by Sheffield Midland Station on 1 February 1870 when the Midland Railway opened a new direct route from Chesterfield to just north of Wicker, now part of the Midland Main Line. Railway workers refer to this route as the "New Road", as opposed to the "Old Road" of the original North Midland line.

Wicker remained open as a goods station until 1965 and has now been demolished. The site is currently occupied by a Tesco Extra supermarket, having previously contained car dealerships and was, until 2006 when the Spital Hill / Savile Street corner was remodelled as part of the Sheffield Northern Relief Road, the home of Amanda King's Made In Sheffield sculpture, now removed.

See also
Sheffield Midland station
Sheffield Victoria railway station

References and notes

Bibliography 
Fox, Peter, (1990) The Midland Line in Sheffield, Sheffield: Platform 5 Publishing Ltd. 
Pixton, B., (2000) North Midland: Portrait of a Famous Route, Cheltenham: Runpast Publishing

Wicker Railway Station
Former Midland Railway stations
Railway stations in Great Britain opened in 1838
Railway stations in Great Britain closed in 1870